Mordellistena perroudi is a species of beetle in the genus Mordellistena of the family Mordellidae. It was described by Mulsant in 1856.

References

Beetles described in 1856
perroudi